The shang is a Tibetan ritual upturned flat handbell employed by Bonpos and shamans.

Description
Shang range in size from approximately three to 20 inches in diameter. They are traditionally believed to originate in Zhangzhung and are symbolically similar to the dril bu or ghanta.
  
Shang are traditionally consecrated and made of sophisticated metallic alloy.

Use
A shang consists of three principal parts: the flat bell part proper; the gankyil, which is the centre piece that holds the knocker; and the knocker or striker proper, which is often made of animal horn.

The shang was believed to be useful in receiving information from the Eastern concept of æther, to induce trance or call spirits. The shang is often used in rites in conjunction with the phurba and namkha.

References

Bells (percussion)
Tibetan musical instruments